This article concerns the period 109 BC – 100 BC.

Notes

References